Jonathan Wallis 'Kraai' Adendorf (born 23 August 1985) is a South African rugby union player for  in the Currie Cup and in the Rugby Challenge. His regular playing position is flanker. Adendorf previously played for the Pumas. He has also played for Maties in the Varsity Cup.

External links

itsrugby.co.uk profile

1985 births
Living people
People from Cape Agulhas Local Municipality
South African rugby union players
Rugby union flankers
Griquas (rugby union) players
Stellenbosch University alumni
Rugby union players from the Western Cape